Arima Fire is an association football club from Trinidad and Tobago. Their home ground is the Larry Gomes Stadium, and the club has previously competed in the TT Pro League.

References

Football clubs in Trinidad and Tobago